Drive Well, Sleep Carefully – On the Road with Death Cab for Cutie is a live music DVD from the Seattle-based band Death Cab for Cutie. The DVD was filmed and directed by filmmaker Justin Mitchell during the band's Transatlanticism-tour in spring 2004 with a 16 mm film camera. The film premiered on June 10, 2005 at the Seattle International Film Festival and was released on DVD on July 26, 2005.

DVD content

Live performances
"The Sound of Settling" (live at the Crystal Ballroom, Portland) – 5:36
"The New Year" (live at the Showbox, Seattle) – 4:31
"We Laugh Indoors" (live at the Marquee Theatre, Tempe) – 8:08
"Styrofoam Plates" (live at Trees, Dallas) – 6:35
"Title and Registration" (live at Howlin' Wolf, New Orleans) – 5:10
"Company Calls" (live at WorkPlay Theater, Birmingham) – 6:51
"Tiny Vessels" (live at Stubb's, Austin) – 3:50
"Transatlanticism" (live at Trees, Dallas) – 6:07
"Expo '86" (live at the Crystal Ballroom, Portland) – 4:00
"We Looked Like Giants" (live at the Fillmore, San Francisco) – 10:17
"Why You'd Want to Live Here" (live at the Wiltern, Los Angeles) – 8:55
"Prove My Hypotheses" (live at the Showbox, Seattle) – 5:11
"Bend to Squares" (live at the Showbox, Seattle) – 4:32*
 The performance of Bend to Squares appears after the end credits.

Acoustic tracks
"The New Year" (acoustic version, live at the Metreon, San Francisco) – 4:38
"Title and Registration" (acoustic version, live at the Metreon, San Francisco) – 3:44
"Lightness" (acoustic version, live at the Metreon, San Francisco) – 3:28

Bonus tracks
"Please Don't Go" (live) – 6:49
"Lightness" (demo version) – 4:21
"Stability" (live in rehearsal) – 10:03

Other content
Interviews
Backstage footage
Outtakes/Deleted Scenes

References

Death Cab for Cutie video albums
Live video albums
2005 video albums
2005 live albums